Semigory is a rural locality (a village) in Kubenskoye Rural Settlement, Vologodsky District, Vologda Oblast, Russia. The population was 12 as of 2002.

Geography 
Semigory is located 46 km northwest of Vologda (the district's administrative centre) by road. Ilekino is the nearest rural locality.

References 

Rural localities in Vologodsky District